Quinton T. Ross Jr. (born October 30, 1968) is an American politician who is the 15th and current president of Alabama State University. A Democrat, Ross served as a member of the Alabama Senate from 2002 to 2017 and served as the Minority Leader from 2014 to 2017.

Early life and education
Ross was born in Mobile, Alabama. He received his education from the following institutions:
 MA, Education, Alabama State University
 BS, Political Science, Alabama State University
 EdD, Educational Leadership, Policy and Law, Alabama State University

Career

Professional experience
Ross has had the following professional experience:
 Director, Adult Education Consortium, H. Trenholm State Technical College, present
 Principal, Booker T. Washington Magnet High School, Montgomery

Political experience

He is a senator in the Alabama State Senate, 2002–present

Ross was found not guilty of corruption in 2011.

Current legislative committees
Ross has been a member of the following legislative committees:
 Commerce, Transportation, and Utilities, Member
 Education, Vice Chair
 Tourism and Marketing, Member
 Veterans and Military Affairs, Member

Organizations
Ross has been a member for the following organizations:
 Member, Council for Leaders in Alabama Schools
 Member, Hutchinson Missionary Baptist Church
 Member, National Association of Secondary School Principals
 Member, Omega Psi Phi

Personal life
Ross is married to J. Kelley, and together they have two children named Quinmari and Quinton. He attends a Baptist church, which is a denomination of Christianity.

References

External links

Democratic Party Alabama state senators
African-American state legislators in Alabama
1968 births
Living people
Politicians from Mobile, Alabama
People acquitted of corruption
21st-century American politicians
Alabama State University alumni
21st-century African-American politicians
20th-century African-American people